Basta Every Day Happy is a Philippine television talk show broadcast by GMA Network. Hosted by Gladys Reyes, Donita Rose, Alessandra de Rossi and Boy Logro, it premiered on May 12, 2014 on the network's morning line up replacing Chef Boy Logro: Kusina Master. The show concluded on January 5, 2015 with a total of 171 episodes. It was replaced by Slam Dunk in its timeslot.

Ratings
According to AGB Nielsen Philippines' Mega Manila household television ratings, the pilot episode of Basta Every Day Happy earned an 11.6% rating. While the final episode scored a 6.9% rating.

Accolades

References

External links
 

2014 Philippine television series debuts
2015 Philippine television series endings
Filipino-language television shows
GMA Network original programming
Philippine television talk shows